Taylor High School is a high school located in Center, Indiana, an unincorporated community approximately 5.5 miles southeast of Kokomo.  It is the only high school of the Taylor Community School Corporation.

Athletics
The following sports are offered at Taylor:

Baseball (boys)
State champs, 2000
Basketball (boys & girls)
Cheerleading (boys & girls)
Cross country (boys & girls)
Football (boys)
Golf (boys & girls)
Soccer (boys & girls)
Softball (girls)
Tennis (boys & girls)
Track & field (boys & girls)
Volleyball (girls)
Wrestling (boys & girls)

See also
 List of high schools in Indiana

References

External links
Taylor High School
Taylor Community School Corporation

Public high schools in Indiana
Educational institutions established in 1949
Schools in Howard County, Indiana
1949 establishments in Indiana